The 1985 Toronto municipal election was held to elect members of municipal councils, school boards, and hydro commissions in the six municipalities that made up Metropolitan Toronto, Ontario, Canada. The election was held on November 12, 1985.

Toronto

Mayor
The mayoral election saw progressive North Toronto councillor Anne Johnston challenge incumbent Art Eggleton. Eggleton won reelection by a significant margin, with Johnston not even winning her former ward.

Results
Art Eggleton - 92,994
Anne Johnston - 59,817
Ann Ladas - 1,473
Gaston Schwab - 1,228
Aaron Abraham - 1,077
John J. Benz - 583
Skip Evans - 557
Fred Dunn - 513
Gary Watson - 433
Ben Kerr - 422
Ronald Rodgers - 341
Andrejs Murnieks - 266
Warren J. Van Evera - 223
Gary Weagle - 202

City and Metro council

The election system was changed in Toronto for the 1985 election. Previously two councillors had been elected from each ward, with the one who received the most votes also getting a spot on Metro Toronto council in addition to their city council seat. Under the new system, one person would be directly elected as a Metro councillor while the other would be elected as a city alderman. Although the Metro councillor would still sit on the city council, the change was accompanied with other structural changes to boost the power of the city aldermen, who had often seen their power and authority diminished by the perception that they were "junior" to the Metro councillors.

Most pairs of incumbent councillors reached tacit agreements with one running for city council and the other for Metro. The one battle between two incumbents was in Ward 5 where in a surprise upset junior councillor Ron Kanter defeated the long serving Ying Hope. Two other long serving councillors were defeated. Joe Piccininni who had represent the Corso d'Italia for 25 years lost to 28-year-old Betty Disero. In the east end NDPers Dorothy Thomas lost in a surprise upset to conservative Paul Christie.

Ward 1 (Swansea and Bloor West Village)
Metro
Derwyn Shea (incumbent) - 10,429
Diana Fancher - 2,675
Robert Szajkowski - 1,270

City
William Boytchuk (incumbent) - 8,491
David White - 6,049
Len Bugeja - 1,030

Ward 2 (Parkdale and Brockton)
Metro
Ben Grys (incumbent) - 7,189
Susan Shaw - 4,223

City
Chris Korwin-Kuczynski (incumbent) - 8,617
Owen Leach - 1,638
Hubert P. Antoic - 777
Jimmy Talpa - 353

Ward 3 (Davenport and Corso Italia)
Metro
Richard Gilbert (incumbent) - 6,745
John Martin - 2,722

City
Betty Disero - 5,096
Joseph Piccininni (incumbent) - 3,835
Judy De Sousa - 1,871
Nick Attarano - 282

Ward 4 (Trinity-Bellwoods and Little Italy)
Metro
Joe Pantalone (incumbent) - 6,519
Joe Pimentel - 2,429
Antonio Nunziata - 666
Hiwon Pak - 336

City
Tony O'Donohue (incumbent) - 5,617
David English - 2,755
Vince Nigro - 2,637

Ward 5 (The Annex and Yorkville)
Metro
Ron Kanter (incumbent) - 9,788
Ying Hope (incumbent) - 5,849

City
Nadine Nowlan - 7,018
David Scott - 4,387
Lawson Oates - 2,509

Ward 6 (Financial District, Toronto - University of Toronto)
Metro
Jack Layton (incumbent) - 9,037
Pearl Loo - 1,972
Edward Jackson - 1,824
Lex Dunkelman - 1,183
Citizen Amber - 414

City
Dale Martin (incumbent) - 6,791
Peter Maloney - 4,923
Jerry Borins - 1,902
Steve BFG Johnson - 1,059

Ward 7 (Regent Park and Riverdale)
Metro
Joanne Campbell (incumbent) - 9,293
James P. Atkins - 1,490
Jack McLeavey - 775

City
Barbara Hall - 6,379
Bill Mole - 2,807
Mike Armstrong - 2,232
Christopher Goulios - 613

Ward 8 (Riverdale)
Metro
Fred Beavis (incumbent) - 7,637
Richard Tyssen - 3,604
Sam Baichoo - 494

City
Thomas Clifford (incumbent) - 7,068
Sheila Cram - 4,035
Michael Tegtmeyer - 339

Ward 9 (The Beaches)
Metro
Tom Jakobek (incumbent) - 12,827
Patterson Higgins - 2,775
Jeremy Agar - 747

City
Paul Christie - 8,985
Dorothy Thomas (incumbent)  - 7,042

Ward 10 (Rosedale and North Toronto)
Metro
June Rowlands (incumbent) - acclaimed

City
Michael Walker (incumbent) - acclaimed

Ward 11 (Forest Hill and North Toronto)
Metro
Kay Gardner - 8,369
Belinda Morin - 7,905
March Tigh - 2,614

City
Michael Gee (incumbent) - 15,345
Christopher Nelson - 2,810

Results are taken from the November 13, 1985 Toronto Star and might not exactly match final tallies.

Changes
Ward 7 Metro Councillor Joanne Campbell resigned on September 8, 1987 to accept an appointment to chair the provincial Social Assistance Review Board. Ward 5 Metro Councillor Ron Kanter also resigned when he won a seat in the 1987 Provincial Election. By-elections were held in both wards on October 29, 1987.

Ward 5 Metro
Ying Hope - 3,506
Meg Griffiths - 2,948
Ila Bossons - 1,390
Ben Kerr - 91

Ward 7 Metro
Roger Hollander - 3,701
Jeff Evenson - 3,479
Bill Mole - 392
Christina Fenluk - 256
Ian McIntyre - 220
Geoff Pimbett - 189
Don Andrews - 104
Martin Amber - 46
Trudy Remmes - 21

Ward 10 Metro Councillor June Rowlands resigned April 6, 1988 upon appointment as Chairman of the Metropolitan Toronto Police Commission; on April 18 Alexandra McCallum was appointed as replacement.

East York
Mayor Johnson commented that the election campaign was the quietest, least active he had ever run. He won handily, even though he spent several days in hospital with back pains. On Council, the incumbents in wards one and four were re-elected. Ward two elected newcomers Bill Buckingham and George Vasilopolous while ward three elected Bob Dale and Steve Mastoras.

† - denotes incumbent status from previous council

Mayor
†Dave Johnson - 17,996
Michael Wyatt - 3,070
David Quirk - 1,041

Councillor
Two councillors were elected to each ward.

Ward 1
†Cy Reader - 3,312
†Bob Willis - 3,035
Marg Pilger - 1,511

Ward 2
Bill Buckingham - 3,155
George Vasilopolous - 2,718
Alan Cobb - 2,569
Michael Prue - 2,187

Ward 3
Bob Dale - 2,380
Steve Mastoras - 1,403
Carol Deschamps - 1,280
Susan Kopsas - 1,015
Les White - 726
Ian Gray - 502
John Papadakis - 426
Eric Padmore - 286

Ward 4
†Peter Oyler - 4,419
†J. Edna Beange - 3,127
Jenner Jean-Marie - 3,066
Jeff Wyatt - 1,085

Trustee
Ward 1 (2 to be elected)
Ruth Goldhar - 2,596
Gail Nyberg - 2,333
Dennis Colby - 1,727

Ward 2 (2 to be elected)
Connie Culbertson - Acclaimed
Ken Maxted - Acclaimed

Ward 3 (2 to be elected)
Margaret Hazelton - 2,241
Len Self - 1,898
Lynda Bolognini - 1,576

Ward 4 (3 to be elected)
Robert J. Murray - 3,277 
Elca Rennick - 3,266
Margaret Millar - 2,582

Hydro Commission
(2 to be elected)
Stan Wadlow - 12,667
Frank Johnson - 10,732
April Medland - 6,023

Etobicoke

Mayor
(incumbent)Bruce Sinclair - 40,739
Winfield (Bill) Stockwell - 23,060
Terry Howes - 1,724
Dave Gavel - 1,714
Roland Ollivier - 1,003

Sinclair was appointed mayor in August 1984 to replace Dennis Flynn when he was elected Metro Chairman.

Board of Control

On September 4, 1984, Etobicoke City Council appointed Controller Bruce Sinclair to replace Flynn as mayor and appointed Lois Griffin to fill the Controller position vacated by Sinclair.

North York
Mel Lastman was re-elected mayor of the City and served until 1997. Maria Augimeri was elected to Ward 5, Peter Li Preti was elected to Ward 3 and Mario Gentile was re-elected as Ward 2 councillor. Esther Shiner was re-elected to Board of Control, but died in office in 1987. Norm Gardner lost his seat on the Board of Control.

Mayor
x-Mel Lastman 86,925
Barbara Greene 29,240
Nick Iamonaco 5,286

Board of Control

Cora Urbel (born Cora Kevany) was a well-known community activist in North York, serving as leader of the North York Concerned Citizens Committee in 1984.  She called for an investigation into the approval of the city's Rampart Development Project, and criticized road reforms that she believed would cause increased traffic in residential areas.  She was endorsed by John Sewell in 1985 as one of North York's most prominent reformers, and was expected to be a strong candidate.  Her poor showing was a surprise to most observers.  Urbel served as president of the Don Mills Residents' Association after the election, and promoted "open space" community development.  She campaigned for North York City Council's tenth ward in 1988, and lost to Don Yuill in a fairly close contest.  She was fifty-nine years old during this campaign, and strongly opposed the extension of Leslie St. past Eglinton Avenue and the decision to widen Don Mills Rd. and Victoria Park Ave.  Urbel supported a series of austerity measures in the early 1990s.  She called for education spending cuts in 1991, and spoke against a proposed 1% Metro Toronto tax hike in 1994.  She died on March 28, 1999.  A road in Toronto was named after her the following year.
Arthur Zins was a self-employed businessman and former public utility administrator, who argued that North York needed his public administration skills.  He campaigned for a position on the North York Hydro Board in 1980, and finished last in a field of nineteen candidates.
Ayube Ally owned a manufacturing plant, and recommended improved facilities for senior citizens.

City Council

Council
Ward 1
x-Mario Sergio acclaimed

Ward 2
 Mario Gentile acclaimed

Ward 3
x-Peter Li Preti 5,123 
Ben Bellantone 2,391
Stanley White 608
Stan Samuel 503
Sally Ann Kernan 448
Harry Dhir 330

Ward 4
x-Frank Di Giorgio 2,293
Barb Shiner 2,070
Maria Rizzo 1,924
Rob Rosenthal 663
Courtney Doldron 282
Joel Goldfarb 118

Ward 5
Maria Augimeri 3.033
Don Yuill 2,340
Norm Kelly 1,529
Joseph Gambano 1,481
Carlo Pascazi 647
Stanley Gordon 357

Ward 6
x-Milton Berger 5,529
Erwin Rosenberg 2,033

Ward 7
x-Irving W. Chapley 5,409
Eric Cohen 3,349
John Butcher 541

Ward 8
Bev Salmon 4,918
Andy Borins 2,845
Betty Reid 956

Ward 9
x-Ron Summers 6,663
Bob Hebdon 2,708
Paul Iafrate 633

Ward 10
Marie Labatte 5,185
Peter Weed 2,399

Ward 11
x-Jim McGuffin 5,974
Jason Pearson 1,376
Peter Clarke 668
Philip Hohl 393

Ward 12
x-Barry Burton 3,788
Colin Williams 1,825
Richard Kirkup 1,238
Peter Nastagamou 331

Ward 13
Joan King 5,290
Allan Ginsberg 1,323
Brian Patterson 1,211
Jeff Smith 563

Ward 14
Paul Sutherland 3,987
Jack Hauseman 3,137
Elwood Helmkay 480

Hydro Commission
(2 elected)
x-Carl Anderson 30,678
Jack Bedder 23,414
Bob Dyer 21,866
Michael Armstrong 20,062
Dino D'Amico 17,590
Phyllis Weinberg 16,165
Mary Hicks 12,554
Alan Moses 9,660
Howard Fletcher 8,261

School Board Trustees
Ward 8 Gerri Gershon
Ward 9 Shelley Stillman
Ward 10 Rene Gordon
Ward 12 Kenneth Crowley

Scarborough

Mayor
(incumbent)Gus Harris: 36,216
Norm Kelly: 24,724
Brian Harrison: 23,981
Dekort: 9,228
Anne McBride: 1,911
Bordonaro: 1,836
Abel Van Wyk: 382

Board of Control (4 elected)
Ken Morrish ; 55,636
(incumbent)Joyce Trimmer ; 53,844
(incumbent)Frank Faubert ; 47,724
Bill Belfontaine ; 39,657
Borisko ; 35,495
Brown ; 16,956
Cotter ; 8,617
Kazia ; 4,993

Public Utilities
Cavanagh ; 45,921
Beatty ; 33,268
Stewart ; 27,686
Speares ; 10,960
Nurse ; 9,445
Alix ; 6,827

City Councillors
Ward 1 -
Harvey Barron ; 3,100
Dan Danielson ; NDP ; 1,985
White ; 1,761

Ward 2 -
Gerry Altobello ; 2,304
Boyle ; 1,662
May McKenzie ; 1,375
Judd ; 574
Morton ; 476

Ward 3 -
John Wardrope ; 3,034
Dave Robertson ; 2,256
McDermott ; 776
Catre ; 769
Zaidi ; 635

Ward 4 -
Kurt Christensen ; 4,195
Carole Ligold ; 2,362

Ward 5 
Marilyn Mushinski ; 4,662
Knight ; 1,285

Ward 6
Florence Cruickshank ; acclamation

Ward 7
Brian Ashton ; 6,230
Lyall ; 1,411

Ward 8 
Shirley Eidt ; 4,804
Murray ; 1,912
Chadha ; 717

Ward 9 
John Mackie ; 6,134
DeSouza ; 2,218

Ward 10 
Maureen Prinsloo ; 4,045
Edmonds ; 1,997

Ward 11 
Scott Cavalier; 3,828
Anderson ; 1,398

Ward 12 ; 
Doug Mahood ; 2,232
Watson, Ron ; 1,350
Dave Pearce ; 1,171
Lam, A ; 898
Bob Watson; 793
Manning ; 433

Ward 13
Bob Sanders ; 1,858
Nutter ; 1,394
Kenton ; 773
Chana ; 767
Chicky Chappell ; 462
Coyle ; 340

Ward 14
Edith Montgomery ; 3,076
McLennon ; 621
Sharma ; 481
Loughlin, B ; 386
Russell ; 338
Kukade ; 158

York
In York, Alan Tonks was easily re-elected. Michael Colle who was alderman for ward 2 in the previous term tried unsuccessfully to obtain a seat on the Board of Control. New councillors Tony Mandarano in Ward 2 and Bob McLean in Ward 6 won their races. Bill Saundercook was the only winner to unseat a running incumbent in Ward 8.

Mayor
(incumbent)Alan Tonks
Guy D'Onofrio

Board of Control (2 elected)
(incumbent)Fergy Brown
(incumbent)Philip White
Michael Colle

Council
Ward 1
Bill Nobleman  (Acclaimed)

Ward 2
Tony Mandarano
Maria de Pasquale

Ward 3
Tony Rizzo (incumbent) won by 570 votes
Ron Bradd

Ward 4
Nicolo Fortunato (incumbent) won by 220 votes
Patrick Canavan

Ward 5
Chris Tonks (incumbent)
Jim Fera

Ward 6
Bob McLean won by 712 votes
Lindsay Cott

Ward 7
Gary Bloor (incumbent) won by 287 votes
Richard Taverner

Ward 8
Bill Saundercook 2,317
Michael Waclawski (incumbent) 2,082

School Board Trustees
School Board Ward 1
K. Hen  (Acclamation)

School Board Ward 2
P. Karageorgos

School Board Ward 3
R. Russell

School Board Ward 4
N D'urzo

School Board Ward 5
P Hainer

School Board Ward 6
J Gribben

School Board Ward 7
S. Mould

School Board Ward 8
M McDowell

Metro Toronto Separate School Trustees

Antonio (Tony) Nigro served on the Metro Toronto Separate School Board from 1974 to 1985.  He was himself a teacher with the North York Board of Education.  He tried to return to the Toronto Catholic School Board in the 2000 Toronto municipal election, but was unsuccessful.
Ralph Paonessa was a first time candidate.  He ran for Ward 15 again in 1988, and finished a closer second against Rick Morelli.  A 1988 newspaper article indicates that he fifty-two years old, and was co-pastor of St. Francis of Assisi Catholic Church.  He wanted students to receive "a truly Catholic education".  Paonessa is now Friar at Saint Lawrence the Martyr Friary in Scarborough, and is active with the National Congress of Italian Canadians.
A. Renato Lavalle was a forty-three-year-old school principal, who sought to maintain the religious orientation of the Catholic school system.

Footnotes

1985
1985 elections in Canada
1985 in Toronto